Navarretia nigelliformis is a species of flowering plant in the phlox family known by the common name adobe navarretia. It is endemic to California, where it is known from the Central Valley and adjacent mountains. It grows in vernally wet depressions in clay soils, such as vernal pools.

It is a hairy annual herb growing up to about 32 centimeters in maximum height. The leaves are divided into many very narrow linear or needlelike lobes. The inflorescence is a head of flowers lined with leaflike bracts with long white hairs. The flower is yellow with brown or purple spots in the throat.

External links
Jepson Manual Treatment
Photo gallery

nigelliformis
Endemic flora of California
Flora of the Sierra Nevada (United States)
Natural history of the Central Valley (California)
Flora without expected TNC conservation status